Paula Spencer may refer to:

 Paula Spencer (journalist), American journalist and author
 Paula Spencer (novel), a 2006 novel by Roddy Doyle